Bocholt is a municipality located in the Belgian province of Limburg. On January 1, 2021, Bocholt had a total population of 13,144. The total area is 59.34 km2 which gives a population density of 208 inhabitants per km2.

Besides the historical Bocholt centre, it also includes the parishes of Kaulille, Reppel and Lozen.

The Priory of Our Lady of Klaarland of the Trappistins is located in Bocholt. Martens brewery, established in 1758, has the second highest production capacity in Belgium at 360 million litres per year.

The town is home to Achilles Bocholt handball club.

Also, the town is known for its historical event in 1910, when the church tower was lifted off its fundaments and moved 9,40 metres, in order to enlarge the church itself, because of it becoming too small to take in the crowd. Italian Alberto Morglia and American engineer Henry Weiss lead the project between April and September 1910.

References

External links
 
Official website - Available only in Dutch

Municipalities of Limburg (Belgium)